Frederick Lloyd (15 January 1880 – 24 November 1949) was a British film and stage actor. His most notable appearances include Doctor Watson in the 1932 film The Hound of the Baskervilles and Mr. Grimwig in David Lean's 1948 literature adaption Oliver Twist .

Biography
He was born Frederick William Lloyd in London on 15 January 1880. His parents were the Reverend Frederick Charles Lloyd and his wife Mary Florence, née Cox. Lloyd was married to theatre actress Auriol Lee from 1911 to 1922. He was later married to actress Yvette Plancon from 1925 to 1929. He died on 24 November 1949 at Hove, Sussex, England.

In an obituary in The Times John Gielgud wrote that 'the theatre has suffered a real loss in the death of Frederick Lloyd', adding 'his enthusiasm and charming joviality and his generous attitude toward the young actor-director — for I was a young man when I met him first — is something I shall remember with great affection and gratitude'.

Selected filmography
 The W Plan (1930)
 Tell England (1931)
 The Perfect Lady (1931)
 The Beggar Student (1931)
 A Gentleman of Paris (1931)
 The Great Gay Road (1931)
 Sleepless Nights (1932)
 The Hound of the Baskervilles (1932)  Dr. Watson
 The Song You Gave Me (1933)
 Up for the Derby (1933)
 Mixed Doubles (1933)
 Royal Cavalcade (1935)
 Radio Pirates (1935)
 Everything Is Thunder (1936)  Muller
 Under Secret Orders (1937)  Col. Marchand
 Oh, Mr Porter! (1937)  Minister
 Secret Lives (1937)
 Weddings Are Wonderful (1938)
 Oliver Twist (1948)  Mr. Grimwig

References

External links

1880 births
1949 deaths
British male film actors
Male actors from London
20th-century British male actors